Job Langbroek (born 1 July 1957) is a former Irish rugby union international player who played for the Irish national rugby union team and also for Blackrock College. He played as a prop forward.
He played for the Ireland team in 1987 winning his only cap against Tonga in a 32–9 win at the 1987 Rugby World Cup. He currently works as an analyst for Davy Stockbrokers.

References

External links

1957 births
Living people
Irish rugby union players
Ireland international rugby union players
Rugby union props